Braswell is an unincorporated community in Oregon County, in the U.S. state of Missouri.

History
A post office called Braswell was established in 1894, and remained in operation until 1915. The community has the name of Thomas Braswell, a first settler.

References

Unincorporated communities in Oregon County, Missouri
Unincorporated communities in Missouri